Aruna Ramchandra Shanbaug (1 June 1948 – 18 May 2015), was an Indian nurse who was at the centre of attention in a court case on euthanasia after spending over 41 years in a vegetative state as a result of sexual assault.

In 1973, while working as a junior nurse at King Edward Memorial Hospital, Parel, Mumbai, Shanbaug was sexually assaulted by a ward boy, Sohanlal Bhartha Walmiki, and remained in a vegetative state following the assault. On 24 January 2011, after Shanbaug had been in this state for 37 years, the Supreme Court of India responded to a plea for euthanasia filed by journalist Pinki Virani, setting up a medical panel to examine her. The court rejected the petition on 7 March 2011. However, in its landmark opinion, it allowed passive euthanasia in India.

Shanbaug died of pneumonia on 18 May 2015, after being in a persistent vegetative state for nearly 42 years.

Biography
Aruna Shanbaug was born in a Konkani Brahmin family 1948 in Haldipur, Uttar Kannada, Karnataka. She worked as a nurse at the King Edward Memorial Hospital (KEM) in Mumbai. At the time of the attack, she was engaged to a doctor employed at the same hospital.

Attack
On 27 November 1973, Shanbaug, then 25 years old, was sexually assaulted by Sohanlal Bhartha Walmiki, a sweeper on contract at the King Edward Memorial Hospital. Sohanlal attacked her while she was changing clothes in the hospital basement. He choked her with a dog chain and raped her. This cut off oxygen to her brain, resulting in a brain stem contusion, cervical cord injury, and cortical blindness. She was discovered at 7:45 am the following morning by a cleaner.

Perpetrator
Sohanlal was caught and convicted of assault and robbery, and he served two concurrent seven-year sentences, being released in 1980. He was not convicted of rape, sexual molestation, or unnatural sexual offense, the last of which could have been punished with life imprisonment.

Journalist and human rights activist Pinki Virani attempted to track down Sohanlal; she believes that Sohanlal changed his name after leaving prison but continued to work in a Delhi hospital, and since neither the King Edward Memorial Hospital nor the court that tried Sohanlal kept a file photo of him, Virani's search failed. Other reports claimed he had subsequently died of AIDS or tuberculosis.

Shortly after Shanbaug's death was announced, however, Sohanlal was tracked down by Mumbai-based journalist Dnyanesh Chavan from Marathi daily Sakal to his father-in-law's village of Parpa in western Uttar Pradesh. He was found to be still living, married with a family, and working as a labourer and cleaner in a power station. After his release from prison, he returned to his ancestral village of Dadupur in western Uttar Pradesh before moving to Parpa in the late 1980s.

When interviewed, Sohanlal described his version of the assault, claiming it had been committed in a "fit of rage" and that he had no clear recollection of when it had taken place or what he may have done, though he denied raping her and said that it "must have been someone else". Sohanlal, then a hospital janitor, had a difficult relationship with Shanbaug, his superior. He says that "there was an argument and a physical fight" when Shanbaug refused to give him leave to visit his ill mother-in-law and said that she would write him up for poor work.

Nurses' strike
Following the attack, nurses in Mumbai went on strike demanding improved conditions for Shanbaug and better working conditions for themselves. In the 1980s, the Municipal Corporation of Greater Mumbai (BMC) made two attempts to move Shanbaug outside the KEM Hospital to free the bed she had been occupying for seven years. KEM nurses launched a protest, and the BMC abandoned the plan.

Supreme Court case

Shanbaug remained in a vegetative state from 1973 until her death in 2015.

On 17 December 2010, the Supreme Court, while admitting the plea to end the life made by activist-journalist Pinki Virani, sought a report on Shanbaug's medical condition from the hospital in Mumbai and the government of Maharashtra. On 24 January 2011, a three-member medical panel was established under the Supreme Court's directive. After examining Shanbaug, the panel concluded that she met "most of the criteria of being in a permanent vegetative state".

On 7 March 2011, the Supreme Court, in a landmark judgement, issued a set of broad guidelines legalizing passive euthanasia in India. These guidelines for passive euthanasia—i.e. the decision to withdraw treatment, nutrition, or water—establish that the decision to discontinue life support must be taken by parents, spouse, or other close relatives, or in the absence of them, by a "next friend". The decision also requires court approval.

In its judgement, the court declined to recognize Virani as the "next friend" of Aruna Shanbaug, and instead treated the KEM hospital staff as the "next friend."

Since the KEM Hospital staff wished that Aruna Shanbaug be allowed to live, Virani's petition to withdraw life support was declined. However, the court further stipulated that the KEM hospital staff, with the approval of the Bombay High Court, had the option of withdrawing life support if they changed their mind:

However, assuming that the KEM hospital staff at some future time changes its mind, in our opinion in such a situation the KEM hospital would have to apply to the Bombay High Court for approval of the decision to withdraw life support.

On 25 February 2014, while hearing a PIL filed by NGO Common Cause, a three-judge bench of the Supreme Court of India said that the prior opinion in the Aruna Shanbaug case was based on a wrong interpretation of the Constitution Bench's opinion in Gian Kaur v. State of Punjab. The court also determined that the opinion was internally inconsistent because although it held that euthanasia can be allowed only by an act of the legislature, it then proceeded to judicially establish euthanasia guidelines. The court referred the issue to a larger Constitution Bench for resolution, writing:In view of the inconsistent opinions rendered in Aruna Shanbaug (supra) and also considering the important question of law involved which needs to be reflected in the light of social, legal, medical and constitutional perspective, it becomes extremely important to have a clear enunciation of law. Thus, in our cogent opinion, the question of law involved requires careful consideration by a Constitution Bench of this Court for the benefit of humanity as a whole.

Response
Following the Supreme Court decision rejecting the plea, the nursing staff at the hospital—who had opposed the petition and had been looking after Shanbaug since she had lapsed into a vegetative state—distributed sweets and cut a cake to celebrate what they termed her "rebirth". A senior nurse at the hospital later said, "We have to tend to her just like a small child at home. She only keeps aging like any of us, does not create any problems for us. We take turns looking after her and we love to care for her. How can anybody think of taking her life?"

Pinki Virani's lawyer, Shubhangi Tulli, decided not to file an appeal, saying "the two-judge ruling was final till the SC decided to constitute a larger bench to re-examine the issue." Pinki Virani said, "Because of this woman who has never received justice, no other person in a similar position will have to suffer for more than three and a half decades."

Death
A few days before her death, Shanbaug was diagnosed with pneumonia. She was moved to the medical intensive care unit (MICU) of the hospital and put on a ventilator. She died the morning of 18 May 2015. Her funeral was performed by the hospital nurses and other staff members.

In popular culture
A non-fiction book titled Aruna's Story was written about the case by Pinki Virani in 1998. Duttakumar Desai wrote the Marathi play Katha Arunachi in 1994–95, which was performed at college level and subsequently staged by Vinay Apte in 2002.

A Gujarati fiction novel, Jad Chetan, was written by popular novelist Harkisan Mehta in 1985 based on Aruna Shanbaug's case.

Anumol played Aruna in the 2014 Malayalam film Maram Peyyumbol.

Aruna's story was also portrayed in the Crime Patrol series of Sony TV.

In June 2020, the Ullu web series named "KASAK" was released, which is loosely based on this case. The role of Sheetal, Shanbaug's stand-in, is portrayed by Ihana Dhillon.

Further reading
 Aruna's Story: the true account of a rape and its aftermath, by Pinki Virani. Viking, 1998 
Arunachi Goshta (Aruna's story) , by Pinki Virani, 1998, Translator: Meena Karnik. Mehta Publishing House. 1998

References

External links
Court ruling, Aruna Shanbaug vs. Union of India, 7 March 2011 at Supreme Court of India
Pinki Virani's Interview - 13 June 2008

1948 births
1973 crimes in India
2011 in case law
2011 in India
2015 deaths
Crime in Mumbai
Health law in India
Indian case law
Indian Hindus
Indian women nurses
Medical controversies in India
Rape in India
Violence against women in India
Deaths from pneumonia in India
Incidents of violence against women
People with hypoxic and ischemic brain injuries
People with disorders of consciousness
People from Uttara Kannada